Perpetuum Jazzile is a Slovenian musical group best known for an a cappella version of Toto rock band's song Africa. The May 2009 video showing a live performance of this version has received close to 22 million views on YouTube.

In 2013, there were 41 performers of whom 24 are female and 17 male. The group occasionally performs with the Slovenian Radio and Television Big Band though most performances are a cappella.

Leadership 
The group was founded by Marko Tiran who led the Gaudeamus Choir for over 17 years. In 2001, the choir's art leadership was passed to Tomaž Kozlevčar. During his 10-year tenure, the group started performing under the new name and achieved international acclaim. Most recently, the group's art leader was Peder Karlsson, from 2011 to 2014.

History 

In 2006, the group recorded the album Čudna noč (Strange Night) which was released by Dallas Records. Group's performance of song Africa earned them high praise from song's original co-writer, David Paich and Toto invited the group for a joint performance at a 2011 concert held near Udine, Italy. In 2011, the choir embarked on a world tour which took them to Croatia, the Czech Republic, Germany, Canada, and USA, where they performed to sold-out venues.

Every year in autumn, the group performs Vokal Xtravaganzza evening concerts at the Cankar Hall in Ljubljana, with guests from Slovenia and abroad. In the past, they have performed with local artists Alenka Godec, Alya, Oto Pestner, Jan Plestenjak, and Nuša Derenda, as well as with international groups Vocalica (Italy), The Real Group (Sweden), ManSound (Ukraine), BR6 (Brazil), and The Real Six Pack (Germany).

In May 2015, Slovenian duo Maraaya who represented Slovenia at the Eurovision Song Contest 2015 with the song Here for You released a video of this song featuring Perpetuum Jazzile. In June 2015, the group performed at the Expo 2015 in Milan, Italy, and at the Guangzhou Opera House in November that year.

Awards 

In 2008, the group was awarded the Vokal Total Award at the International Choir Festival and International A Cappella Competition and it also won awards at the international jazz vocal music competition in Tilburg, Netherlands, and the World Choir Games in Graz, Austria. In 2010, the group was awarded the "Viktor Award", a top level music award in Slovenia.

Discography 
 Ko boš prišla na Bled (When You Come to Bled) (2000) 
 Pozabi, da se ti mudi (Forget You're In a Hurry) (2003) 
 As (2004)
 Čudna noč (Strange night) (2006) 
 Africa (2009)
 Perpetuum Jazzile Live [Vokal Xtravaganzza 2008 - DVD] (2009)
 Vocal Ecstasy (German Tour Edition - CD) (2012)
 Vocal Ecstasy (German Tour Edition Superbox - CD+DVD) (2012)
 Thank You For The Music (30th Anniversary Jubilee Edition - CD') (2013)
 Both Sides (Double Album - CD) (2016)

References

Bibliography 
 Eddy Kester, “Perpetuum Jazzile hits all the right notes to become Slovenia's best-known brand”, bne IntelliNews, 30 July 2015.

External links 
Perpetuum Jazzile Website

A cappella musical groups
Slovenian jazz ensembles
Slovenian choirs
Musical groups established in 1983
Musical groups from Ljubljana